The grey-winged francolin (Scleroptila afra) is a species of bird in the family Phasianidae.
It is found in Lesotho and South Africa.

References

External links

 Grey-winged Francolin - Species text in The Atlas of Southern African Birds

Scleroptila
Birds of Southern Africa
Birds described in 1790
Taxonomy articles created by Polbot